The Bapuji Educational Association is a large educational organization of over 50 educational institutions across the city of Davangere, India.

The institute was in the year 1958 with the start of a first grade college in Davangere. . Before this, Children in Davangere could study only till High School or Class 10. There was no college to continue their higher studies and were forced to go to larger cities like Bengaluru, Mysuru, etc., To address this need, Sri Dharmaratnakara Rajanahally Maddurayappa, a well known Businessman and a Philanthropist, built the first College which is now popularly known as DRM Science College. To manage the administrative affairs of this college and to foster the cause of education in Davanagere town, Bapuji Educational Association was formed by him. Under his tenure as the Founder President, several colleges including Medicine, Engineering, Nursing, Commerce, etc., were built. Then ruler of state and King of Mysore, His Highness Sri Jayachamarajendra Wadiyar noted his contributions and conferred him with title of "Dharmaratnakara". The city of Davangere is forever indebted to his noble contributions.

Two medical colleges, two dental colleges, and an engineering college are run by this association. There are over 50 colleges and schools run by this organization today.  Many families have donated towards building colleges and hostels of Bapuji Educational Association like Rajanahally, Maganur, Ajjampur, etc.,  Several eminent people have served towards growth of this Association like Sri. S. Kotrabasappa.  Since 1972, Dr.Shamanuru Shivashankarappa, MLA has been the significant personality behind the growth of this organisation.

Further colleges were included in the Association over time, in fields including Management, Pharmacy, Commerce.

References

Educational organisations based in India
Education in Davangere